The Westshore Wolves are a Junior B Ice Hockey team based in Colwood, British Columbia, Canada. They are a member of the South Division of the Vancouver Island Junior Hockey League. The Wolves entered the VIJHL in 2012, replacing a former franchise, the Westshore Stingers. They play their home games at The Q Centre under head coach Jackson Penney.

History

The Wolves were one of two expansion teams in 2012-13 for the VIJHL, the other being the Nanaimo Buccaneers. In three seasons, the Wolves have done relatively well, finishing top three in their division every year. As with many expansion franchises, they have slowly gained momentum and become a strong team within a few years..

Season-by-season record

Note: GP - Games Played, W - Wins, L - Losses, T - Ties, OTL - Overtime Losses, Pts - Points, GF - Goals for, GA - Goals against

References

External links
Official website of the Westshore Wolves

Ice hockey teams in British Columbia
2012 establishments in British Columbia
Ice hockey clubs established in 2012